Lionel Percy Smythe  (4 September 1839 in London – July 1918) was a British artist, and etcher.

Life and work

Lionel Percy Smythe was the illegitimate son of Percy Clinton Sydney Smythe, 6th Viscount Strangford and Katherine Benham (later Mrs Wyllie). He was born in London in 1839 and spent his early years in France, where his younger sister and brother were born. The family returned to London in 1843 and lived in Gloucester Crescent, Camden). Smythe was educated at King's College School. He was also partly educated in France and spent holidays there at Wimereux in Normandy with his stepfather William Morrison Wyllie and family. He trained in art at the Heatherley School of Fine Art. He was half brother of the artists William Lionel Wyllie and Charles William Wyllie.

Smythe exhibited at the Royal Academy from 1863 (becoming a member in 1911) and the Royal Institute of Painters in Watercolours from 1881 (becoming a member in 1880) - he eventually transferred his allegiance to the Royal Watercolour Society in 1892, becoming a member in 1894. Smythe painted rural landscapes, genre and maritime scenes, people and animals in both oils and watercolours, and became associated with the Idyllists.

Smythe and his wife Alice made frequent trips to France and eventually settled in Normandy in 1879, in an old Napoleonic fortress on the coast at Wimereux - until the building was inundated by the sea. Subsequently, they moved, in 1882, to the Château d'Honvault on a hill between Wimereux and Boulogne. The couple had three children, of whom Minnie Smythe also became a painter. Smythe lived and worked here until his death in 1918, the countryside and rural life of the area becoming the main inspiration for his art.

Selected works

The Arabian Nights (1865)
Shorthanded (1874, marine)
Field of the cloth of gold: Twixt Calais and Guines (1883)
Mowers with elm trees
The First Buds of Spring (1885)
Springtime (1885)
Germinal (1889)
Harvesters returning
Children fording a river by a continental town (1891)
Boulogne fishing folk (1893)
La Tricoteuse
Bleaching linen (pre 1896)
Caught in the frozen palms of spring
Spring outing
Under the Greenwood Tree (1902)
The Farmyard at Château d'Honvault, Wimereux (1908)
The Adoration (1909)
The Harvester (1910)
Summer
Shrimpers
A Thick Night Off the Goodwins (marine)
The Bait Digger (1910)
When life is hard its better to be young (1911)
Hounds

Notes

Further reading

A. L. Baldry. Lionel P. Smythe, A.R.A., R.W.S.; An Appreciation of his Work and Methods (The Studio Magazine, May 1910, p. 177).
Rosa M. Whitlaw & W. L. Wyllie. Lionel P. Smythe - His Life and Work (Selwyn & Blount, London 1923)
Scott Wilcox & Christopher Newall. Victorian landscape watercolors'' (Hudson Hills, 1992), pp166–167.

External links
 
L. P. Smythe online (artcyclopedi)
Paintings by L. P. Smythe
L P Smythe (The modernist journals project)
"Bleaching line" (painting for sale at Christie's)
Photo of L P Smythe (National Portrait Gallery)
 Profile on Royal Academy of Arts Collections

19th-century English painters
English male painters
20th-century English painters
Landscape artists
English watercolourists
1839 births
1918 deaths
British people of Dutch descent
Royal Academicians
20th-century English male artists
19th-century English male artists